The Venetian Lagoon is an enclosed bay of the Adriatic Sea, in northern Italy, in which the city of Venice is situated. Its name in the Italian and Venetian languages, —cognate of Latin , "lake"—has provided the English name for an enclosed, shallow embayment of salt water, a lagoon.

Location

It is around 8% land, including Venice itself and many smaller islands. About 11% is permanently covered by open water, or canal, as the network of dredged channels are called, while around 80% consists of mud flats, tidal shallows and salt marshes. The lagoon is the largest wetland in the Mediterranean Basin.

It is connected to the Adriatic Sea by three inlets: Lido, Malamocco and Chioggia.

Development
The Lagoon of Venice is the most important survivor of a system of estuarine lagoons that in Roman times extended from Ravenna north to Trieste. In the sixth century, the Lagoon gave security to Romanised people fleeing invaders (mostly the Huns). Later, it provided naturally protected conditions for the growth of the Venetian Republic and its maritime empire. It still provides a base for a seaport, the Venetian Arsenal, and for fishing, as well as a limited amount of hunting and the newer industry of fish farming.

The Lagoon was formed about six to seven thousand years ago, when the marine transgression following the Ice Age flooded the upper Adriatic coastal plain. Deposition of river sediments compensated for the sinking coastal plain, and coastwise drift from the mouth of the Po tended to close tidal inlets with sand bars.
The present aspect of the Lagoon is due to human intervention. In the fifteenth and sixteenth centuries, Venetian hydraulic projects to prevent the lagoon from turning into a marsh reversed the natural evolution of the Lagoon. Pumping of aquifers since the nineteenth century has increased subsidence.  Originally many of the Lagoon's islands were marshy, but a gradual programme of drainage rendered them habitable.  Many of the smaller islands are entirely artificial, while some areas around the seaport of the Mestre are also reclaimed islands.  The remaining islands are essentially dunes, including those of the coastal strip (Lido, Pellestrina and Treporti).

Venice Lagoon was inhabited from the most ancient times, but it was only during and after the fall of the Western Roman Empire that many people, coming from the Venetian mainland, settled in a number large enough to found the city of Venice. Today, the main cities inside the lagoon are Venice (at the centre of it) and Chioggia (at the southern inlet); Lido di Venezia and Pellestrina are inhabited as well, but they are part of Venice. However, the most part of the inhabitants of Venice, as well as its economic core, its airport and its harbor, stand on the western border of the lagoon, around the former towns of Mestre and Marghera. At the northern end of the lagoon, there is the town of Jesolo, a famous sea resort; and the town of Cavallino-Treporti.

Ecosystem

Occasionally, bottlenose dolphins enter the lagoon, possibly for feeding.

The level of pollution in the lagoon has long been a concern The large phytoplankton and macroalgae blooms of the late 1980s proved particularly devastating. Researchers have identified the lagoon as one of the primary areas where non-indigenous species are introduced into the Mediterranean Sea.

Negative effects to the environment such as air pollution, loss of landscape, surface water pollution, erosion, and decreasing water quality have occurred due to the emission and impacts of cruise ships transiting into the Venetian Lagoon.

From 1987 to 2003, the Venice Lagoon was harmed by a relevant reduction of the nutrient inputs and of the macroalgal biomasses due to climate change; of the concentrations distributions of total nitrogen, organic phosphorus and organic carbon in the upper sediments. Meanwhile, the seagrasses started a natural process of recolonization, restoration the pristine conditions of the marine ecosystem.

Islands

The Venice Lagoon is mostly included in the Metropolitan City of Venice, but the south-western area is part of the Province of Padua.

The largest islands or archipelagos by area, excluding coastal reclaimed land and the coastal barrier beaches:
Venice 5.17 km
Sant'Erasmo 3.26 km
Murano 1.17 km
Chioggia 0.67 km
Giudecca 0.59 km
Mazzorbo 0.52 km
Torcello 0.44 km
Sant'Elena 0.34 km
La Certosa 0.24 km
Burano 0.21 km
Tronchetto 0.18 km
Sacca Fisola 0.18 km
San Michele 0.16 km
Sacca Sessola 0.16 km
Santa Cristina 0.13 km

Other inhabited islands include:
Cavallino
Lazzaretto Nuovo
Lazzaretto Vecchio
Lido
Pellestrina
Poveglia
San Clemente
San Francesco del Deserto
San Giorgio in Alga
San Giorgio Maggiore
San Lazzaro degli Armeni
Santa Maria della Grazia
San Pietro di Castello
San Servolo
Santo Spirito
Sottomarina
Vignole

See also
 List of islands of Italy
 Magistrato alle Acque
 MOSE Project

Notes

References

Further reading
 Additional editions printed in 1900, 1904, & 1909; paperback in 2008.

External links

Atlas of the Lagoon - 103 thematic maps and associated explanations grouped in five sections: Geosphere, Biosphere, Anthroposphere, Protected Environments and Integrated Analysis
SIL – Sistema Informativo della Laguna di Venezia
Lagoon of Venice information
Satellite image from Google Maps
MILVa – Interactive Map of Venice Lagoon
Comune di Venezia, Servizio Mobilità Acquea, Thematic cartography of Venice Lagoon
Photo gallery by Enrico Martino about Venice's lagoon small islands, night life

 
Geography of Venice
Chioggia
World Heritage Sites in Italy
Bays of Italy
Bays of the Adriatic Sea
Ramsar sites in Italy
Lagoons of Italy
7 Most Endangered Programme